.460 and .460 Magnum may refer to two different firearms cartridges:

 .460 Weatherby Magnum (rifle)
 .460 S&W Magnum (revolver)

.460 can also refer to:

 .460 Steyr (rifle)
 .460 Rowland (pistol)